Victor Ramirez may refer to:

Victor R. Ramirez (born 1974), American politician
Víctor Ramírez (soccer) (born 1988), Salvadoran footballer
Vic Ramirez, baseball outfielder and manager, see 1992 Texas Rangers season
Victor Emilio Ramírez (born 1984), Argentine boxer